Tanger Factory Outlet Centers, Inc. is a real estate investment trust headquartered in Greensboro, North Carolina that invests in shopping centers containing outlet stores in the United States and Canada.

As of December 31, 2019, the company owned 32 shopping centers comprising 12.0 million square feet and over 2,400 stores.

The company's largest tenants are Gap, Ascena Retail Group, Nike, Inc., PVH, H&M, Ralph Lauren Corporation, and VF Corporation.

Notable properties owned by the company include Tanger Outlets The Walk, Tanger Outlets Southaven (Memphis), Tanger Outlets Pittsburgh Tanger Outlets Foxwoods, Tanger Outlets Ottawa and Tanger Outlets Columbus.

History
In 1981, Stanley Tanger opened the Burlington Manufacturer's Outlet Center in Burlington, North Carolina.

In May 1993, the company incorporated as a real estate investment trust and became a public company via an initial public offering.

In January 2009, Steven B. Tanger, the son of the founder and the namesake of the Steven Tanger Center for the Performing Arts, became president and CEO of the company. That same year in September, founder Stanley K. Tanger resigned the position of chairman.

In October 2010, the founder died at age 87.

In January 2011, the company announced a 50/50 joint venture with RioCan Real Estate Investment Trust to develop outlet malls in Canada. In June 2011, the company formed a joint venture with Simon Property Group to develop a shopping center south of Houston, Texas.

In October 2015, the company sold 5 shopping centers for $150.7 million. In April 2019, the company sold 4 shopping centers to Singerman Real Estate and The Outlet Resource Group for $130.5 million.

References

External links

1981 establishments in North Carolina
American companies established in 1981
Companies based in Greensboro, North Carolina
Companies listed on the New York Stock Exchange
Real estate investment trusts of the United States
Shopping malls established in 1981
Shopping center management firms